Earl Carlton "Irish" Krieger (August 30, 1896 – November 10, 1960) was an American football  and basketball player, coach of football, basketball, and baseball, and official in football and basketball.  He was the third head football coach at Bowling Green State Normal School—now known as Bowling Green State University—serving for one season in 1921 and compiling a record of 3–1–1.  Krieger was also the head basketball coach at Bowling Green State Normal during the 1921–22 season, tallying a mark of 4–10, and the school's head baseball coach in the spring of 1922, notching a record of 7–1.  Krieger played college football at Ohio University, from which he graduated in 1920.  He played professional football in the National Football League (NFL), for the Detroit Tigers in 1921 and the Columbus Panhandles in 1922.

In addition to coaching at Bowling Green, Krieger was also a member of the football coaching staffs at his alma mater and at the University of Tennessee.  For 25 years until his retirement in 1953, he worked as a football and basketball official for the Big Ten Conference.  He was also a member of the National Collegiate Athletic Association's football rules committee.  Krieger died at the age of 64 on November 10, 1960.

Head coaching record

Football

References

External links
 

1896 births
1960 deaths
American football ends
American football fullbacks
American football halfbacks
American men's basketball players
College men's basketball referees in the United States
College football officials
Bowling Green Falcons baseball coaches
Bowling Green Falcons football coaches
Bowling Green Falcons men's basketball coaches
Columbus Panhandles players
Detroit Tigers (NFL) players
Ohio Bobcats football coaches
Ohio Bobcats football players
Ohio Bobcats men's basketball players
Tennessee Volunteers football coaches
Sportspeople from Columbus, Ohio
Coaches of American football from Ohio
Players of American football from Columbus, Ohio
Baseball coaches from Ohio
Basketball players from Columbus, Ohio
Basketball coaches from Ohio